The Government of Ogun State consists of elected representatives and appointed officials responsible for the government of Ogun State, Nigeria. Ogun State has a population of about 2 million people, and is one of the 36 states that make up the Federal Republic of Nigeria. The state government is composed of the executive, legislative, and judicial branches, whose powers are vested by the Constitution in the Governor, the House of Assembly, and the High Court. The judiciary operates independently of the executive and the legislature. At the local level, elected officials are in charge of local government areas.

Executive
The executive branch is headed by the Governor, assisted by the Deputy Governor, both of whom are elected. The Governor appoints the heads of parastatals, state-owned bodies, judicial officers, permanent secretaries and members of the Executive Council with the exception of the Deputy Governor. The Civil Service is administered by the head of service, a career civil servant, with each ministry managed by a permanent secretary. The commissioner is responsible for policy, while the permanent secretary provides continuity and is responsible for operations.

Governor

As the highest ranking official in the executive, the governor of Ogun State wields significant influence in matters relating to the governance of the state. As in most presidential systems, the governor is both the head of government and head of state. The governor is empowered by the Constitution to preside over the Executive Council, as well as to appoint, dismiss or reappoint its members–excluding the Deputy Governor–at will. In addition, the governor may sign legislation passed by the House into law or may veto it; however, if the governor does not make a decision to sign or veto a bill, the legislation automatically becomes law after 30 days.

A vote by a two-thirds majority in the House can overrule the governor. The same vote is required to initiate an impeachment process of the Governor or Deputy Governor. the Deputy Governor assumes the office of Acting Governor when the Governor is unable to discharge the duties of the office, until the governor resumes duty, or until election of a new one.

Deputy Governor

The position of Deputy Governor of Ogun State constitutes the vice-head of state and government. The position created when the federation returned to civilian authority under the Second Republic. Whoever holds the post is considered the second highest official in the executive branch. The deputy governor is also the first official in line to succeed the governor, should that office be vacated.

The deputy governor is elected concurrently on a ticket with the governor for a term of four years, renewable once. Noimot Salako-Oyedele, an engineer, is the current deputy governor. She was chosen by the governor Dapo Abiodun to be his running mate in the 2019 election.

Executive Council

The Executive Council is currently made up of:

Special Advisers

Legislature

The Ogun State House of Assembly is the unicameral legislative body of the state government. It was established in 1979 by part II, section 84, of the Constitution of Nigeria, which states, "There shall be a House of Assembly for each of the States of the Federation". Led by a Speaker, the House of Assembly consists of 26 members, each elected to four-year terms in single-member constituencies by plurality. Its primary responsibility is to create laws for the peace, order and effective government of the state.

Powers
There are numerous powers the Constitution expressly and specifically grants to the House of Assembly as they are necessary for its relevance. These include the powers to approve budget estimates presented to it by the executive; to make laws establishing the chargeable rates and the procedure to be used in assessing and collecting the rates charged by each local government council; to confirm gubernatorial appointments, oversee and monitor activities of government agencies, review policy implementation strategies of the executive, and summon before it and question a commissioner about the conduct of his or her ministry, especially when the affairs of that ministry are under consideration; and to initiate impeachment proceeding in order to secure the removal of the Governor or Deputy Governor.

Representatives
The legislature consists of elected representatives from each constituency. As of June 12, 2015, they were:

Judiciary

The administration of justice in Ogun State is one of the fundamental duties of the judiciary of the state. This branch of government explains and applies the laws by hearing and eventually making decisions on various legal cases. It has a regulatory or supervisory body known as the Judicial Service Commission, which takes care of appointment, promotion and disciplinary issues of the judiciary.

The Chief Judge of Ogun State is the appointed head of the judicial branch. The Chief Judge is also the most senior judge and presiding member of the High Court of Justice. Among other responsibilities, the Chief Judge has the ceremonial duty of administering the oath of office of the Governor. In modern tradition, the Chief Judge retires voluntarily at sixty years of age, or statutorily at sixty-five years of age.

Most appointments to the judiciary are made by the Governor, but acting upon the recommendation of the National Judicial Council. At present, there are about 10 judicial divisions within the High Court of Justice, and about 26 judges carrying out their professional work.

Elections and voting

Local government
Local government areas handle local administration under an elected Chairman.

Ogun State is divided into twenty-three local government areas (LGAs).

List of government agencies of Ogun State

The agencies of Ogun State consists of twenty (20) ministries and twenty seven (27) departments and they are as follows:

See also
Nigerian National Assembly delegation from Ogun

References

 
Ogun State